The Surgeon General (French: médecin-général) is the professional head of the Canadian military health jurisdiction, the adviser to the Minister of National Defence and the Chief of Defence Staff on all matters related to health, and head of the Royal Canadian Medical Service. The Surgeon General may also be appointed the commander of the Canadian Forces Health Services Group, which fulfils all military health system functions from education and clinical services to research and public health. It consists of the Royal Canadian Medical Service, the Royal Canadian Dental Corps, personnel from other branches of the armed forces, and civilians, with health professionals from over 45 occupations and specialties in over 125 units and detachments across Canada and abroad. When appointed Director General Health Services, the Surgeon General is also the senior health services staff officer in the Department of National Defence. The Surgeon General is normally appointed to the Medical Household as Honorary Physician (QHP) or Honorary Surgeon (QHS) to Her Majesty the Queen.

History
The first head of the Canadian military medical service was Colonel Darby Bergin, a prominent physician and surgeon who was also Member of Parliament for Cornwall, president of the College of Physicians and Surgeons of Ontario, founder of the 1st Volunteer Militia Rifle Company of Cornwall, and first commanding officer of the 59th Stormont and Glengarry Battalion of Infantry (now the Stormont, Dundas and Glengarry Highlanders). Selected by the Minister of Militia and Defence, the Honourable Sir Adolphe Caron, to organize the North-West Field Force medical services during the North-West Rebellion of 1885, Colonel Bergin's own proposed appointment as Director General Medical Services, was overruled by the Minister in favour of Surgeon General.

Major-General the Honourable Sir Eugène Fiset KT, CMG, DSO, ED, GGHS, BA, MB, MD, MS was the first Surgeon General after the establishment of the Canadian Army Medical Corps in 1904 (renamed the Royal Canadian Army Medical Corps in 1919), the creation of which was the second step in bringing all military health personnel under unified administration. Appointed Director General Medical Services as a colonel in 1903, he was subsequently appointed Deputy Minister of Militia and Defence in 1906 and promoted to Surgeon General in 1914. (Until 1917, Surgeon General was not an appointment, but the general officer rank for medical officers in the Imperial and British colonial services, normally equivalent to major-general but originally limited to colonel by regulations governing the Canadian militia prior to 1906). After retirement in 1923, he was elected Member of Parliament for Rimouski and appointed Lieutenant-Governor of Quebec in 1939.

Major-General GB Chisholm CC, MC & Bar, CBE, ED, MD was Surgeon General during the Second World War when the Canadian military health services reached their largest size in history. He was appointed the first federal Deputy Minister of Health in late 1944 and was elected as the first director-general of the World Health Organization in 1948.

Major-General KA Hunter OBE, CStJ, CD, QHP, MD was the first modern Surgeon General following the 1959 integration of the Royal Canadian Army Medical Corps with the sister medical services of the Royal Canadian Navy and Royal Canadian Air Force to form a joint military medical professional-technical organization, the Canadian Forces Medical Service (CFMS). The CFMS was renamed the Royal Canadian Medical Service in 2013.

List of Surgeons General or Equivalent Appointments

Surgeon General of the Militia Medical Services

1. Lieutenant-Colonel (later Colonel) Darby Bergin April 1885

'Director General of the Medical Staff / Director General Medical Services' (Canadian Militia)

2. Colonel JLH Neilson February 1898

Director General of Medical Services (Canadian Militia/Army)

3. Colonel Sir MJC Eugène Fiset KCMG July 1903, promoted to Surgeon General (Major-General) December 1914 while Deputy Minister of Militia

4. Colonel GC Jones KStJ, CMG, MD December 1906, promoted to Surgeon General (Major-General) September 1915 (Note 1)

5. Major-General JT Fotheringham KStJ, CMG, VD, MD November 1917 (Note 1)

6. Major-General GL Foster KStJ, CB, MD December 1920

7. Colonel JW Bridges CBE  June 1921

8. Colonel HM Jacques DSO, MD April 1925

9. Colonel JT Clarke CBE, CStJ, MD June 1930

10. Colonel AE Snell CMG, OStJ, DSO  September 1933

11. Colonel JL Potter BStJ, MD July 1936

12. Brigadier RM Gorssline OStJ, DSO, MD November 1939

13. Major-General GB Chisholm CC, MC & Bar, CBE, ED, MD September 1942 (Note 1)

14. Major-General CP Fenwick CB, CBE, MC, ED, MD January 1945 (Note 1)

15. Brigadier CS Thompson OBE, ED, MD March 1946 (Note 1)

16. Brigadier WL Coke OBE, CD, MD October 1947 (Note 1)

17. Brigadier KA Hunter OBE, CStJ, CD, QHP, MD November 1952 (Note 1)

18. Brigadier SGU Shier OBE, CD, MD March 1956 (Note 1)

19. Brigadier P Tremblay OBE, MD October 1958 (Note 1)

Note 1: The Canadian Army established separate Directors or Directors General Medical Services for their overseas forces in 1914 to 1920 and 1940 to 1946. The medical services of the Royal Canadian Navy and Royal Canadian Air Force were led by separate Directors General from 1940 to 1959. Prior to 1940, the Royal Canadian Navy's medical service was too small to have a full-time medical directorate and from 1911 until 1924 the senior naval surgeon in Halifax acted as Principal Medical Officer, ensuring Royal Navy medical regulations were correctly applied to the RCN..

Surgeon General

20. Major-General KA Hunter OBE, CStJ, CD, QHP, MD January 1959

21. Surgeon Rear-Admiral TB McLean CStJ, CD, QHS, MD January 1960

22. Surgeon Rear-Admiral WJ Elliot OStJ, CD, QHS, MD, CM September 1964

23. Major-General DGM Nelson CD, QHP, MD, DPH, FACPM July 1968

24. Major-General JWB Barr CMM, KStJ,  CD, QHP, MD, CM, DHA July 1970

25. Rear-Admiral RH Roberts CD, QHP, MD, FRCPC, FACP September 1973

26. Major-General WG Leach CMM, CD, QHP, MD April 1976

27. Major-General VA McPherson CD, QHP, MD, FRCSC August 1980

28. Major-General R Dupuis CMM, CStJ, CD, QHP, MD, CSPQ, FRCPC July 1982

29. Major-General RW Fassold OStJ, CD, QHP, MD September 1985

30. Rear-Admiral CJ Knight CMM, CStJ, CD, QHP, MD January 1988

31. Major-General JJ Benoit CStJ, CD, QHP, MD, FRCPC August 1990

32. Major-General P Morisset CMM, CStJ, CD, QHP, MD, MHA August 1992

33. Major-General WA Clay CMM, OStJ, CD, QHP, MD, MHSc, DSc(hon) October 1994

34. Brigadier-General C Auger CD, QHS, MD, FRCSC June 1998

35. Colonel SF Cameron OMM, CD, QHP, MD January 2000 (Note 2)

36. Brigadier-General HF Jaeger OMM, SSStJ,  MSM, CD, QHP, MD, LLD(hon), plsc, pcsc June 2004

37. Commodore HW Jung OMM, OStJ,  CD, QHP, MD, MA July 2009

38. Brigadier-General JJ-RS Bernier OMM, CD, QHP, MD, MPH, DEH, DSc(hon), FRCPC(hon), rmc, plsc July 2012. On transfer to the Primary Reserve component he was promoted Major-General and served as the chair of the Chiefs of Medical Services (COMEDS) of NATO 2015–2018

39. Brigadier-General HC MacKay OMM, CD, QHP, MD, MHSc, FRCPC(hon) June 2015

40. Brigadier-General AMT Downes CD, QHP, MD, MPH July 2017. Promoted Major-General in 2019.

41. Major-General (Acting While So Employed) Marc Bilodeau, CD, MD, CCFP(EM), FCFP July 2020. (Note 3). Promoted substantive Major-General 2022.

Note 2: Command and Director General responsibilities were held separately by Major-General MJL Mathieu CMM, CD, MSc, LLD(hon), CHE (Jan 2000–Apr 2005)Major-General (Retired) Lise Mathieu, CMM. Retrieved 10 March 2016 from http://www.royalroads.ca/news-events/convocation/awards/major-general-retired-lise-mathieu-cmm and Commodore MF Kavanagh OMM, OStJ, CD, MD, MHA, CHE (Apr 2005–Jul 2007)National Defence and the Canadian Forces Senior Officer Biography - Brigadier General Jaeger. Retrieved on 1 February 2012 from http://www.cmp-cpm.forces.gc.ca/dsa-dns/sa-ns/ab/sobv-vbos-eng.asp?mAction=View&mBiographyID=116Retrieved 18 August 2015 from http://www.nauticapedia.ca/dbase/Query/Biolist3.php?name=Kavanagh,%20M.F.&id=369&Page=1&input=Kavanagh,%20M.F

Note 3: Command and Director General responsibilities held by Rear-Admiral Rebecca L. Patterson, OMM, MSM, CD, RN (Jul 2020-2021) and Brigadier-General Scott F. Malcolm holds command responsibilities from Jul 2021

References

Canadian Armed Forces
Healthcare in Canada